The 2019 Sun Belt Conference men's soccer tournament was the 25th edition of the Sun Belt Conference Men's Soccer Tournament. The tournament decided the Sun Belt Conference champion as well as the conference's automatic berth into the 2019 NCAA Division I men's soccer tournament. The tournament began on November 13 and concluded on November 17, 2019.

Appalachian State hosted the tournament, and all matches were played at ASU Soccer Stadium in Boone, North Carolina.

Coastal Carolina won the tournament, defeating fifth-seed and defending champions, Georgia State, 6–5, on penalty kicks after 1–1 draw. Coastal Carolina earned the conference's berth into the NCAA Tournament, where they reached the second round before losing to SMU.

Seeds

Bracket

Results

First round

Semifinals

Final

Top goalscorers

Sun Belt Tournament Best XI 

MVP in Bold

References

External links 
 Sun Belt Tournament

2019
2019 in sports in North Carolina
Sun Belt Men's Soccer Tournament